"Me U & Hennessy" is a song by American hip hop recording artist Dej Loaf. The song was released on April 20, 2015 by Columbia Records. The official remix features American rapper Lil Wayne.

Music video
The music video for "Me U & Hennessy" was released on April 17, 2015.

Commercial performance
"Me U & Hennessy" peaked at number six on the U.S. Bubbling Under Hot 100 chart. The song also reached number 38 on the Hot R&B/Hip-Hop Songs chart.

Charts

References

External links
 
 

2015 singles
2015 songs
Dej Loaf songs
Columbia Records singles
Songs written by Dej Loaf